Quemado is a census-designated place (CDP) in Maverick County, Texas, United States. Its population was 230 at the 2010 census.

Geography

Demographics

2020 census

As of the 2020 United States census, there were 162 people, 41 households, and 41 families residing in the CDP.

2000 census
As of the census of 2000, 243 people, 81 households, and 64 families were residing in the CDP. The population density was 2,053.3 people/sq mi (781.9/km2). The 96 housing units averaged 811.2/sq mi (308.9/km2). The racial makeup of the CDP was 53.09% White, 2.47% African American, 42.39% from other races, and 2.06% from two or more races. Hispanics or Latinos of any race were 87.65% of the population.

Of the 81 households, 40.7% had children under the age of 18 living with them, 66.7% were married couples living together, 11.1% had a female householder with no husband present, and 19.8% were not families. About 16.0% of all households were made up of individuals, and 9.9% had someone living alone who was 65 or older. The average household size was 3.00, and the average family size was 3.42.

In the CDP, the age distribution was 28.0% under 18, 7.8% from 18 to 24, 23.9% from 25 to 44, 21.4% from 45 to 64, and 18.9% who were 65  or older. The median age was 38 years. For every 100 females, there were 96.0 males. For every 100 females age 18 and over, there were 94.4 males.

The median income for a household in the CDP was $11,576, and for a family was $11,957. Males had a median income of $11,818 versus $25,000 for females. The per capita income for the CDP was $7,099. About 48.6% of families and 51.7% of the population were below the poverty line, including 50.9% of those under the age of eighteen and 33.3% of those 65 or over.

Education
Quemado is served by the Eagle Pass Independent School District.

References

External links
 Handbook of Texas Online article

Census-designated places in Maverick County, Texas
Census-designated places in Texas